Ruth Metzler (born Arnold, 23 May 1964) is a Swiss politician who served as a Member of the Swiss Federal Council from 1999 to 2003. A member of the Christian Democratic People's Party (CVP/PDC), she headed the Federal Department of Justice and Police.

Biography

Political career
Educated at the University of Fribourg, Metzler served as the cantonal executive in charge of finance in Appenzell Innerrhoden from 1996 to 1999.

She was elected to the Swiss Federal Council on 11 March 1999, as a member of the Christian Democratic People's Party. Metzler took office at the Federal Department of Justice and Police the following 1 May, succeeding Arnold Koller; she won 14 referendums during her time in office. On 1 January 2003, she assumed the vice presidency of the Swiss Confederation.

On 10 December 2003, she became the third Federal Councillor not to be reelected in the history of the Swiss Federal State. In the 2003 Federal Assembly election, her party lost many voters and the Swiss People's Party (SVP/UDC) became the largest party of Switzerland. The Swiss People's Party then requested another seat in the Federal Council. In the elections for the Federal Council on 10 December, the Federal Assembly did not reelect Metzler and elected Christoph Blocher instead, by 121 votes to 116 on the third round of voting. She challenged her CVP colleague Joseph Deiss for his seat, but lost by 138 to 96. Metzler kept her seat until the end of the year and Christoph Blocher succeeded her on 1 January 2004.

After politics
She published the memories of those years under the title "Grissini & Alpenbitter", 2004, . She taught between February and July 2004 at the University of St. Gallen a class called "Gestaltungsmöglichkeiten in der Politik" which can be translated as "scope for design in politics". Since April 2005 she has been working for the Swiss pharmaceutical company Novartis.

References

External links

www.ruthmetzler.ch – personal website launched for the sale of her book

|-

|-

1964 births
People from Sursee District
Living people
Members of the Federal Council (Switzerland)
Christian Democratic People's Party of Switzerland politicians
University of Fribourg alumni
Swiss Roman Catholics
Swiss women lawyers
Women members of the Federal Council (Switzerland)
20th-century women rulers
20th-century Swiss women politicians
20th-century Swiss politicians
21st-century Swiss women politicians
21st-century Swiss politicians
20th-century Swiss lawyers
21st-century Swiss lawyers
20th-century women lawyers
21st-century women lawyers